is a Japanese professional racing cyclist, who currently rides for UCI Continental team .

Career
Yamamoto won the third stage of the Tour de Hokkaido twice while still a student at the National Institute of Fitness and Sports in Kanoya, first in 2010 and again in 2013. He won the Under-23 Japanese National Road Race Championships twice in a row in 2010 and 2011.
He joined  in 2014 and stayed on as it became a Professional Continental team starting in the 2015 season. He was named in the start list for the 2016 Giro d'Italia.

Major results

2009
 2nd Road race, National Junior Road Championships
 Asian Junior Road Championships
7th Time trial
8th Road race
2010
 1st  Road race, National Under-23 Road Championships
 1st Stage 3 Tour de Hokkaido
2011
 1st  Road race, National Under-23 Road Championships
 3rd  Road race, Summer Universiade
 3rd Japan Cup Open Road Race
 6th Overall Tour de Hokkaido
2012
 2nd  Time trial, Asian Under-23 Road Championships
 6th Time trial, National Under-23 Road Championships
 8th Overall Tour de Singkarak
2013
 National Under-23 Road Championships
1st  Time trial
3rd Road race
 1st Stage 3 Tour de Hokkaido
 4th Time trial, Asian Under-23 Road Championships
2014
 National Road Championships
3rd Time trial
3rd Road race
2015
 6th Time trial, National Road Championships
 6th Overall Tour de Korea
2017
 5th Overall Tour de Flores
 7th Overall Tour de Kumano
2018
 1st  Road race, National Road Championships
 5th Overall Tour de Ijen
2019
 5th Overall Tour de Hokkaido
 5th Overall Tour de Siak
 7th Oita Urban Classic
2022
 2nd Tour de Okinawa
 10th Overall Tour of Japan

Grand Tour general classification results timeline

References

External links
 

1991 births
Living people
Japanese male cyclists
Sportspeople from Nara Prefecture
Universiade medalists in cycling
Universiade bronze medalists for Japan
Medalists at the 2011 Summer Universiade